Latham is an unincorporated community in Weakley County, Tennessee, United States.

Notes

Unincorporated communities in Weakley County, Tennessee
Unincorporated communities in Tennessee